Allan Dipple (born 28 March 1956) is a former Australian racing cyclist. He won the Australian national road race title in 1987.

References

External links

1956 births
Living people
Australian male cyclists
Cyclists from Johannesburg